Uff Yeh Mohabbat is a 2014 Pakistani romantic drama serial airing on Geo TV. It is written by Faiza Iftikhar, directed by Amin Ali and is a production of A&B Entertainment. The drama was first aired 19 January 2014 on Geo TV starring Goher Mumtaz as Sameer, Jugan Kazim as Ghazal, Meharbano as Dilkash, Hina Bayat as Firdous, Mnazoor Qureshi as Nana and others. The story revolves around two characters Sameer and Dilkash. Sameer is a mature guy who loves music, he will be appointed as a music teacher in the school where Dilkash is studying. Dilkash is a very lively and immature girl who hasn’t experienced any difficulties in life and eventually she will fall madly in love with her music teacher. Retitled as Guitar Se Piyaar, it also aired in India on Zindagi.

Plot
A tale of two people Sameer and Dilkash, and their lives. The serial is about their union and separation and at the end the two unite again. The conflict rises as the two protagonists are of different natures. Sameer is a very serious and a self-made man who believes in himself and takes every decision very carefully. Whereas Dilkash is a lively girl who thinks life is nothing more than a party to enjoy, for which you are invited to just once. The fall of a beautiful relation is shown in this serial and the reason is their nature, but at the end all the differences vanishes as it is love which will be triumphant.

Cast
Goher Mumtaz as Sameer
Juggan Kazim as Ghazal
Mehar Bano as Dilkash
Hina Khawaja Bayat as Firdous
Naima Khan as Rukiya
Manzoor Qureshi as Nana
Fahad Sheikh

Music
The sound track of this drama is Uff Yeh Mohabbat (Laiyan Laiyan), sung by Goher Mumtaz of Jal and Hadiqa Kiani. While the song is recorded, mixing and mastered by GM Studioz. The song was released on Geo TV on Valentine's Day.

References

External links

Geo TV original programming
A&B Entertainment
Urdu-language television shows